Edward Hawksford (7 November 1931 – 1985) was an English professional footballer who played in the Football League for Mansfield Town.

References

1931 births
1985 deaths
English footballers
Association football forwards
English Football League players
Mansfield Town F.C. players